is a Japanese actress.

Career
In 2019, Kawai made her acting debut in the short film Yodominaku, Yamanai. In 2022, she was given the Best Newcomer award at the 43rd Yokohama Film Festival for her roles in A Balance and It’s a Summer Film.

Personal life 
Her hobbies are dancing, singing, drawing, playing basketball, and singing. When she was in third grade, she started going to the dance studio her younger sister was attending. Although she once stopped dancing when in middle school, she was in the dance club in high school. As she continued dancing, she realized the joy of "expressing" and decided to become an actress.

She respects Mirai Moriyama as both an actor and a dancer.

Filmography

Film

Television

Music videos

Awards

References

External links
 Official profile at Dongyu Club 
 

2000 births
21st-century Japanese actresses
Actresses from Tokyo
Japanese film actresses
Japanese television actresses
Living people